Charles Louis Scot-Brown (31 August 1923 – 18 September 2021) was a Canadian veteran.

Born in Temiscaming, Quebec, Scot-Brown became a cadet at age 17. He was from a military family – his father fought in the First World War and was killed in the Second World War. Scot-Brown served overseas during the latter combat, leading a platoon to destroy a radar station during the Invasion of Normandy. He was also part of an airborne force during Operation Market Garden. He was awarded the French Legion of Honour.

References

External links
Portrait at the Canadian Art Database Project
The Memory Project
CBC interview

1923 births
2021 deaths
Canadian military personnel of World War II
People from Abitibi-Témiscamingue
Recipients of the Legion of Honour